2–4 Cathedral Street is an historic building in Dunkeld, Perth and Kinross, Scotland. It is two storeys, with a six-window frontage on the ground floor and five on the first floor.

See also 
 List of listed buildings in Dunkeld And Dowally, Perth and Kinross

References 

Cathedral Street 2–4
Category B listed buildings in Perth and Kinross
1715 establishments in Scotland